The Fenglingdu Yellow River Railway Bridge is a single-track railway bridge over the Yellow River. It joins Shanxi and Shaanxi and carries the Datong–Puzhou railway.

History
The bridge was completed in 1970.

During 2019, the bridge was closed to allow renovation work to take place. The bridge deck was replaced and the line was electrified. It reopened on 30 December 2019.

References

Railway bridges in China
Bridges completed in 1970
Bridges in Shaanxi
Bridges in Shanxi
1970 establishments in China
Bridges over the Yellow River